Archernis flavidalis is a moth in the family Crambidae. It was described by George Hampson in 1908. It is found in South Africa and in Kenya.

References

Moths described in 1908
Spilomelinae
Moths of Africa